The Primetime Engineering Emmy Awards, or Engineering Emmys, are one of two sets of Emmy Awards that are presented for outstanding achievement in engineering development in the television industry. The Primetime Engineering Emmys are presented by the Academy of Television Arts & Sciences (ATAS), while the separate Technology and Engineering Emmy Awards are given by its sister organization, the National Academy of Television Arts and Sciences (NATAS).

The Primetime Engineering Emmy is presented to an individual, company or organization for engineering developments so significant an improvement on existing methods or so innovative in nature that they materially affect the transmission, recording or reception of television. The award is determined by a jury of highly qualified, experienced engineers in the television industry. In addition, since 2003 the ATAS also bestows in most years the Philo T. Farnsworth Award, which is a Primetime Engineering Emmy Award given to honor companies and organizations that have significantly affected the state of television and broadcast engineering over a long period of time, and the Charles F. Jenkins Lifetime Achievement Award, which has been given in most years since 1991 to one or more individuals whose contributions over time have significantly affected the state of television technology and engineering.

The Primetime Emmy Awards have been given since 1949 to recognize outstanding achievements in primetime television for performance, for the Creative Arts, and for Engineering.  The Primetime Engineering Emmys have separately been given annually since 1978 (the year that ATAS and the NATAS agreed to split ties), although Special Emmys for Outstanding Achievement in Engineering Development were occasionally bestowed in prior years. The awards which have been given include the Engineering Emmys, which are accorded the Emmy Statuette, and two other levels of recognition, the Engineering Plaque, and the Engineering Citation.

Awards

1978 
Engineering Emmy Award: Petro Vlahos for the ULTIMATTE Video-Matting Device
Engineering Citation: To the Society of Motion Picture and Television Engineers (SMPTE)

1979 
Engineering Emmy Award: Ampex Corporation for the Automatic Scan Tracking System for Helical Video Tape Equipment
Engineering Citation: Magicam, Inc. for the Development of Real Time Tracking of Independent Scenes

1980 
Engineering Emmy Award: National Institute of Standards and Technology (NIST), Public Broadcasting Service (PBS), and American Broadcasting Company (ABC) for Closed Captioning for the Deaf System
Engineering Emmy Citation: David Bargan for the '409' and 'TRACE' Computer Programs used for Off-line Videotape Editing
Engineering Emmy Citation: Vital Industries for its Pioneering Development of Digital Video Manipulation Technology
Engineering Emmy Citation: Convergence Corporation for the ECS-100 Video Tape Editing Systems

1981 
Engineering Emmy Award: Rank Cintel for the Mark III Flying Spot Telecine

1982 
Engineering Emmy Award: Hal Collins for Contributions to the Art and Development of Videotape Editing (posthumous)
Engineering Emmy Award: Dubner Computer Systems, Inc., and the American Broadcasting Company (ABC) for the Dubner CBG-2 Electronic Character and Background Generator
Engineering Citation: Chapman Studio Equipment for the Development of Crane Systems

1983 
Engineering Emmy Award: Eastman Kodak for the Development of High Speed Color Film 5294/7294 Color Negative Film
Engineering Citation: Ikegami Electronics for the Development of the EC-35 (a camera used for electronic cinematography)
Engineering Citation: Ampex Corporation for Digital Effects Displaying Capabilities with Improved Picture Quality

1984 
Engineering Emmy Award: None given
Engineering Citation: Corporate Communications Consultants Inc. for the 60XL Color Correction by Armand Belmares Sarabia

1985 
Engineering Emmy Award: Auricle Control Systems (ACS) for the Auricle Time Processor

1986 
Engineering Emmy Award: Nagra, Inc., for the Nagra Recorder
Engineering Emmy Award: CBS, Sony and Cinedco for Design and Implementation of Electronic Editing Systems for Film Programs

1987 
Engineering Emmy Award: Spectra Image, Inc. for D220 Dual Headed Video Disc Player

1988
Engineering Emmy Award: Optical Disc Corporation for the Recordable Laser Videodisc System
Engineering Emmy Award: Sony for the DVR-1000 Component Digital VTR

1989 
Engineering Emmy Award: Pacific Video Inc. for the Electronic Laboratory
Engineering Emmy Award: Cinema Products Corporation for the Steadicam
Engineering Plaque: Composite Image Systems for the Pin Registered Transfer Process
Engineering Plaque: Istec, Inc. for the WESCAM Camera Mount
Engineering Plaque: Matthews Studio Electronics for the Nettman Cam-Remote
Engineering Plaque: Offbeat Systems for the Streamline Scoring System
Engineering Plaque: Steadi-Film Corporation for the Steadi-Film System
Engineering Plaque: UCLA Film and Television Archive for the restoration of the Fred Astaire Specials

1990 
Engineering Emmy Award: Comark Communications, Inc. and Varian/Eimac for the Klystrode UHF High Power Amplifier Tube and Transmitter
Engineering Emmy Award: Zaxcom Video, Inc. for the TBC Control System
Engineering Plaque: Samuelson Alga Cinema for the Louma Camera Crane
Engineering Plaque: Alan Gordon Enterprises for Image 300 35mm High Speed Camera

1991
Engineering Emmy Award: Vari-Lite for the Series 200 Lighting System
Engineering Emmy Award: Camera Platforms International, Inc. for the D/ESAM Digital Mixer
Engineering Plaque: Manfred Klemme for the Dcode TS-1 Time Code Slate
Engineering Plaque: Lightmaker Company for the AC/DC HMI Ballast
Engineering Plaque: George Hill for Optex UK - Mini Image Intensifier for ENG Cameras
Engineering Plaque: Grass Valley Group for the Kadenza Digital Picture Processor
Charles F. Jenkins Lifetime Achievement Award: Harry Lubcke

1992 
Engineering Emmy Award: Charles Douglass for the Invention and Development of the Post Production Sweetener
Engineering Emmy Award: The Accom D-Bridge 122 Video Encoder
Engineering Plaque: Filmlook, Inc. for the Filmlook Process for Film Simulation
Charles F. Jenkins Lifetime Achievement Award: Kerns H. Powers

1993 
Engineering Emmy Award: Avid Technology for the Media Composer
Engineering Emmy Award: Newtek for Video Toaster
Engineering Plaque: CBS Laboratories for Mini-Rapid Deployment Earth Terminal (RADET)
Engineering Plaque: Les Aseere for the scientific detective work that solved the mystery of type "C" video tape dropout and ventilated scanner debris.
Charles F. Jenkins Lifetime Achievement Award: Richard S. O'Brien

1994 
Engineering Emmy Award: Philips Var-Lite for the VL5 Wash Luminaire
Engineering Emmy Award: Kodak for the Keykode Edgeprint Film Numbering System
Engineering Plaque: Cinema Products Corporation, Research in Motion, Evertz Microsystems, and the National Film Board of Canada, four creative hardware developers whose reader, decoder and user technology enabled the widespread use of Keykode.

1995 
Engineering Emmy Award: C-Cube Microsystems for the MPEG Encoding Chip Set
Engineering Emmy Award: Barber Technologies for the Barber Boom
Engineering Emmy Award: Tascam for the DA-88 Digital Multitrack Recorder
Engineering Emmy Award: Philips Laboratories for the Ghost Cancellation
Engineering Plaque: Saunders Electric Incorporated for the Synchronized Load Commander System and Mobile Power Distribution
Charles F. Jenkins Lifetime Achievement Award: Julius Barnathan

1996 
Engineering Emmy Award: LaserPacific Media Corporation for the Supercomputer Assembly
Engineering Emmy Award: General Instrument Corporation for the Digicipher Digital Television System
Engineering Emmy Award: Scientific-Atlanta for the Powervu Digital Video Compression System
Engineering Emmy Award: Tektronix for the Profile Professional Disk Recorder
Charles F. Jenkins Lifetime Achievement Award: Joseph Flaherty

1997 
Engineering Emmy Award: J.L. Fisher for the J.L. Fisher Camera Dolly
Engineering Emmy Award: Panasonic for the AJ-LT75 DVCPRO Laptop Editor
Engineering Emmy Award: Grand Alliance for the Digital TV Standard
Engineering Plaque: The BOOM TRAC Microphone Dolly System
Engineering Plaque: Alan Gordon Enterprises for the Mark V Director's Viewfinder
Charles F. Jenkins Lifetime Achievement Award: Richard E. Wiley

1998 
Engineering Emmy Award: Brian Critchley of Digital Projection International and Larry Hornbeck of Texas Instruments' for the Digital Micromirror Device POWER Displays Projector
Engineering Emmy Award: Tiffen for the Design and Manufacture of State-of-the-art Camera Lens Filters
Engineering Emmy Award: Philips Digital Video Systems and Eastman Kodak for the Design and Manufacture of the Industry-Standard High-definition Digital Telecine
Engineering Plaque: Avid for the Real-Time Multicamera System
Engineering Plaque: Tektronix for the Lightworks 'Heavyworks' Multistream Editing Systems
Charles F. Jenkins Lifetime Achievement Award: Yves Faroudja

1999 
Engineering Emmy Award: Sony for the HDCAM HDW-500 Digital HD Studio VTR
Engineering Emmy Award: George Hill and Derek Lightbody for Optex UK., for the Aurasoft Soft Light
Engineering Plaque: Videotek for the VTM-200 Series Multi-Format, On-Screen Monitoring
Engineering Plaque: Spectracine, Inc., for the Spectra Professional IV-A Digital Exposure Meter
Charles F. Jenkins Lifetime Achievement Award: Charles A. Steinberg

2000 
Engineering Emmy Award: The Dorrough Loudness Meter
Engineering Emmy Award: The Panavision Lightweight Camera
Engineering Emmy Award: Clairmont Camera for the MovieCam Superlight
Engineering Plaque: Lipsner-Smith Company and Consolidated Film Industries (CFI) for their joint development of the Model CF-8200 Ultrasonic Film Cleaning Machine
Engineering Plaque: TEAC America, Inc. for the MMR-8 and MMP-16 Recorders
Engineering Plaque: Soundmaster Group for the Integrated Operations Nucleus ION Operating Environment
Engineering Plaque: Cooke Optics for Cooke Prime Lenses
Charles F. Jenkins Lifetime Achievement Award: Charles Mesak

2001 
Engineering Emmy Award: Vari-Lite for the VARI*LITE Virtuoso Console
Engineering Emmy Award: Cast Lighting, Ltd. for WYSIWYG
Engineering Emmy Award: Da Vinci Systems for 2K Color Enhancement System
Engineering Emmy Award: Pandora International for Pogle Platinum with MegaDef
Engineering Emmy Award: Panavision for the Primo Lens Series
Engineering Emmy Award: Apple, Inc. for FireWire
Engineering Emmy Award: Clairmont Camera for Clairmont Camera Lenses 
Engineering Plaque: Chapman and Leonard Studio Equipment, Inc. for the LenCin Pedestal
Charles F. Jenkins Lifetime Achievement Award: Gilbert P. Wyland

2002 
Engineering Emmy Award: TM Systems for The Digital Solution to Language Translation, Dubbing and Subtitling
Engineering Emmy Award: Apple Inc. for Final Cut Pro
Engineering Emmy Award: 2d3 for the Boujou Automated Camera Tracker
Engineering Emmy Award: ARRI for Arriflex Cameras
Engineering Plaque: Barber Technologies for the EZ Prompter
Engineering Plaque: HBO Interactive Ventures for Band Of Brothers Interactive Television Programming
Charles F. Jenkins Lifetime Achievement Award: Charles Cappleman

2003 
Engineering Emmy Award: Dedo Weigert of Dedotec, USA Inc. for the Dedolight 400 Series Lighting System
Engineering Emmy Award: Emory Cohen, Randolph Blim and Doug Jaqua of LaserPacific Media Corporation for the 24P HDTV Post-Production System
Engineering Emmy Award: David Pringle, Leonard Pincus, Ashot Nalbandyan, Thomas Kong and George Johnson of Lightning Strikes, Inc. for Softsun
Engineering Plaque: NewTek, Inc. for LightWave 3D
Charles F. Jenkins Lifetime Achievement Award: Ray Dolby
Philo T. Farnsworth Corporate Achievement Engineering Award: Panavision

2004 
Engineering Emmy Award: Dolby Laboratories for the Dolby LM 100 Broadcast Loudness Meter With Dialogue Intelligence
Engineering Emmy Award: Sony and Panavision for the First 24P Digital Imaging System
Engineering Plaque: Philip John Greenstreet of Rosco Laboratories, Inc. for Roscolite Scenic Backdrops
Engineering Plaque: David Grober and Scott Lewallen of Motion Picture Marine for Perfect Horizon
Charles F. Jenkins Lifetime Achievement Award: Les Paul
Philo T. Farnsworth Corporate Achievement Engineering Award: Chyron Corporation

2005 
Engineering Emmy Award: Dolby Laboratories for Dolby E Audio Coding Technology
Engineering Emmy Award: Sprint Corporation for Sprint PCS VisionSM Multimedia Services
Engineering Emmy Award: Toon Boom Animation Inc. for USAnimation Opus
Engineering Emmy Award: MobiTV for the first mobile television network and technology platform to bring live broadcasts to mobile phones.
Engineering Plaque: Litepanels, Inc for Litepanels Mini LED Light

2006 
Engineering Emmy Award: None awarded
Engineering Plaque: Scott Walker, Mark Walker, Jeff Watts, Scott Noe, Richard Brooker of BOXX Communications, LLC for Vid-Wave Boxx
Engineering Plaque: Harry Fagle for the Four-Channel Video Integrator (Quad-Split)

2007 
Engineering Emmy Award: None awarded
Engineering Plaque: TM Systems, LLC for the TM Systems QC Station
Engineering Plaque: Osram Sylvania for Osram HMI Metal Halide Lamp Technology
Engineering Plaque: Digital Vision for DVNR Image Processing Hardware and DVO Image Processing Software
Engineering Plaque: Silicon Optix for the Teranex Video Computer
Charles F. Jenkins Lifetime Achievement Award: Howard A. Anderson, Jr.

2008 
Engineering Emmy Award: Joint Video Team Standards Committee (JVT) for the development of the High Profile for H.264/MPEG-4 AVC.
Engineering Emmy Award: Glenn Sanders and Howard Stark of Zaxcom, Inc. for the Deva Location Sound Recorder.
Engineering Plaque: Scott Leva for the Precision Stunt Air Bag
Engineering Plaque: Sebastian Cramer and Andreas Dasser of P+S Technik GmbH for the Skater Dolly Product Family
Engineering Plaque: Craige Bandy and Ed Bandy of Tricam Video Productions Company for the 360 Overhead Jib
Engineering Plaque: Georg Dole, Swen Gerards, Jan Huewel and Daniel Schaefer of Coolux Media Systems for Pandoras Box Real-Time Compositing Media Server
Charles F. Jenkins Lifetime Achievement Award: Woo Paik
Philo T. Farnsworth Corporate Achievement Engineering Award: Evertz Technologies Limited

2009 
Engineering Emmy Award: Dolby Laboratories for the Dolby DP600 Program Optimizer
Engineering Emmy Award: Fujinon and NHK for the Fujinon Precision Focus Assistance System
Engineering Emmy Award: Jim Henson's Creature Shop for the Henson Digital Puppetry Studio
Engineering Emmy Award: Litepanels, Inc.for Litepanels LED Lighting Products
Engineering Plaque: Herb Ault, Aaron Hammel and Bob Anderson of Grip Trix, Inc., for the Grip Trix Electric Motorized Camera Dolly
Philo T. Farnsworth Corporate Achievement Engineering Award: The National Aeronautics and Space Administration (NASA). In commemoration of the 40th anniversary of the technological innovations that made possible the first live broadcast from the lunar surface by the crew of Apollo 11 on July 20, 1969.

2010 
Engineering Emmy Award: Stagetec for the NEXUS Digital Audio Routing
Engineering Plaque: Apple, Inc. for Apple Final Cut Studio
Engineering Plaque: Avid Technology for Avid Media Access
Engineering Plaque: David Eubank for the pCAM Film + Digital Calculator
Engineering Plaque: Showtime Sports Interactive
Charles F. Jenkins Lifetime Achievement Award: Ron Estes and Robert Seidenglanz
Philo T. Farnsworth Corporate Achievement Engineering Awards: Desilu and Digidesign (now Avid Technology)

2011 
Engineering Emmy Award: IBM and Fox Group for the Development and Application of LTFS (Linear Tape File System)
Engineering Emmy Award: Panavision and Sony for Single Chip Digital Camera Technology used for Primetime Television Production.
Engineering Emmy Award: Ultimate Arm, for the Ultimate Gyrostabilized Remote Controlled Crane
Engineering Emmy Award: Apple, Inc. for the iPad
Engineering Plaque: Yahoo! for Connected TV to Yahoo!
Engineering Certificate: The Xfinity iPad app
Engineering Certificate: Time Warner iPad app
Charles F. Jenkins Lifetime Achievement Award: Andy Setos
Philo T. Farnsworth Corporate Achievement Engineering Awards: Time Warner and Time Warner Cable for the creation of the Full Service Network

2012 
Engineering Emmy Award: Colorfront, Ltd. for Colorfront On-Set Dailies
Engineering Emmy Award: FilmLight for Truelight On-Set and Baselight TRANSFER
Engineering Emmy Award: Academy of Motion Picture Arts and Sciences for the Academy Color Encoding System (ACES)
Engineering Emmy Award: The American Society of Cinematographers (ASC) Technology Committee for the ASC Color Decision List (ASC CDL)
Engineering Emmy Award: Dolby Laboratories Inc. for the Dolby PRM-4200 Professional Reference Monitor
Engineering Emmy Award: Sony for the BVM E250 OLED Reference Monitor.
Engineering Emmy Award: Toon Boom Animation Inc. for the Toon Boom Storyboard Pro
Engineering Emmy Award: Netflix Inc. for its new streaming video service.
Engineering Plaque: Adobe Systems for the Adobe Pass Viewer Authentication process
Charles F. Jenkins Lifetime Achievement Award: Dr. Richard Green
Philo T. Farnsworth Corporate Achievement Engineering Award: Eastman Kodak Company

2013 
Engineering Emmy Award: YouTube
Engineering Emmy Award: Aspera, for FASP Transport Technology
Engineering Emmy Award: Josh C. Kline of Digital Dailies Web Based Streaming Production Dailies and Cuts
Engineering Emmy Award: iZotope for RX Audio Repair Technology (iZotope)
Engineering Emmy Award: Lightcraft Technology for Previzion Virtual Studio System
Engineering Plaque: LAWO AG Audio networking and routing system for large scale television entertainment productions
Engineering Plaque: Final Draft Inc., Final Draft Screenwriting Software
Charles F. Jenkins Lifetime Achievement Award: Chris Cookson
Philo T. Farnsworth Corporate Achievement Engineering Award: Sennheiser Electronic Corporation

2014 
Engineering Emmy Award: Philips Professional Broadcasting for the LDK6000, DPM CCD Multi-format HDTV Camera System
Engineering Emmy Award: Sony Professional Solutions of America for the Multi-format HDTV CCD Fiber Optic Camera System
Engineering Emmy Award: High-Definition Multimedia Interface (HDMI)
Engineering Emmy Award: Intel Corp for High-bandwidth Digital Content Protection (HDCP)
Engineering Emmy Award: Advanced Television Systems Committee (ATSC) for its Recommended Practice on Techniques for Establishing and Maintaining Audio Loudness for Digital Television
Charles F. Jenkins Lifetime Achievement Award: Laurence J. Thorpe
Philo T. Farnsworth Corporate Achievement Engineering Award: The Society of Motion Picture and Television Engineers (SMPTE)

2015 
Engineering Emmy Award: Mark Franken for EdiCue
Engineering Emmy Award: Michael Sechrest, Chris King, and Greg Croft for SpeedTree
Engineering Emmy Award: Zhou Wang, Alan Bovik, Hamid Sheikh and Eero Simoncelli for the Structural Similarity (SSIM) Video Quality Measurement Model
Charles F. Jenkins Lifetime Achievement Award: Garrett Brown
Philo T. Farnsworth Corporate Achievement Engineering Award: Grass Valley USA, LLC

The 67th Primetime Emmy Engineering Awards Ceremony took place on October 28, 2015 at Loews Hollywood Hotel.

2016 
Engineering Emmy Award: SyncOnSet software application for production design
Engineering Emmy Award: Ncam Technologies for camera tracking technology
Engineering Emmy Award: Sony for the Sony 2/3" 4K Imaging System
Engineering Emmy Award: Saunders Electric for Saunders Mobile UPS Power Station
Engineering Emmy Award: Zaxcom Inc for innovations in digital wireless technology.
Engineering Emmy Award: Group It For Me! cloud-based software
Charles F. Jenkins Lifetime Achievement Award: John C. Malone
Philo T. Farnsworth Corporate Achievement Engineering Award: NHK's Science & Technology Research Laboratories

The 68th Primetime Emmy Engineering Awards Ceremony took place on October 26, 2016 at Loews Hollywood Hotel.

2017 
Engineering Emmy Award: Arri for ARRI Alexa Camera System
Engineering Emmy Award: Canon Inc and Fujifilm (Fujinon) for 4K Zoom Lenses
Engineering Emmy Award: The Walt Disney Company for Disney Global Localization
Engineering Emmy Award: McDSP for the SA-2 Dialog Processor 
Engineering Emmy Award: Joint Collaborative Team on Video Coding (JCT-VC) for High Efficiency Video Coding (HEVC)
Engineering Emmy Award: Shotgun Software
Charles F. Jenkins Lifetime Achievement Award: Leonardo Chiariglione
Philo T. Farnsworth Corporate Achievement Engineering Award: Sony Corporation

The 69th Primetime Emmy Engineering Awards Ceremony took place on October 25, 2017 at Loews Hollywood Hotel.

2018 
Engineering Emmy Award: Chemical Wedding for Artemis Digital Director's Viewfinder
Engineering Emmy Award: Cospective for cineSync Review and Approval
Engineering Emmy Award: Codex Digital for Codex Recording Platform and Capture Media
Engineering Emmy Award: Blue Microphones for Blue Mix-Fi Headphones 
Engineering Emmy Award: Production Resource Group for PRG GroundControl Followspot
Engineering Plaque: Customized Animal Tracking Solutions (CATS) for the CATS Cam: Animal-Borne Multi-Sensor Video System
Charles F. Jenkins Lifetime Achievement Award: Wendy Aylsworth
Philo T. Farnsworth Corporate Achievement Engineering Award: Avid

The 70th Primetime Emmy Engineering Awards Ceremony took place on October 24, 2018 at the JW Marriott Hotel LA Live.

2019 
Engineering Emmy Award: Boris FX for Sapphire
Engineering Emmy Award: iZotope for RX 7 Audio Repair
Engineering Emmy Award: FabFilter for Pro-Q3 Audio Equalizer
Engineering Emmy Award: SilhouetteFX LLC for SilhouetteFX Rotoscoping
Engineering Emmy Award: Boris FX for Mocha Pro Motion Tracking System
Engineering Emmy Award: Joint Photographic Experts Group for JPEG Image Compression
Charles F. Jenkins Lifetime Achievement Award: Hugo Gaggioni
Philo T. Farnsworth Corporate Achievement Engineering Award: The American Society of Cinematographers (ASC)

The 71st Primetime Emmy Engineering Awards Ceremony took place on October 23, 2019 at the JW Marriott Hotel LA Live.

2020 
Engineering Emmy Award: Evercast for Evercast real-time collaboration platform
Engineering Emmy Award: HP Inc for ZCentral Remote Boost
Engineering Emmy Award: Sohonet for ClearView Flex
Engineering Emmy Award: Teradici for Cloud Access Software
Engineering Emmy Award: Apple Inc for Apple ProRes
Engineering Emmy Award: CODEX for CODEX RAW Workflow
Engineering Emmy Award: Dan Dugan for Gain Sharing Automatic Microphone Mixing
Engineering Emmy Award: Epic Games for Unreal Engine
Engineering Emmy Award: RE:Vision Effects for optical flow-based postproduction video tools 
Engineering Emmy Award: Sound Radix for Sound Radix Auto-Align Post
Engineering Emmy Award: Bill Spitzak, Jonathan Egstad, Peter Crossley and Jerry Huxtable for Nuke

The 72nd Primetime Emmy Engineering Awards Ceremony was streamed live on Emmys.com on Thursday, Oct. 29, 2020 at 5:00 p.m. PDT.

2021 
Engineering Emmy Award: Marcos Fajardo, Alan King, and Thiago Ize for Arnold Global Illumination Rendering System
Engineering Emmy Award: ARRI for ARRI Skypanel
Engineering Emmy Award: CEDAR Audio Ltd. for CEDAR Studio
Engineering Emmy Award: Golaem for Golaem Crowd
Engineering Emmy Award: Stephen Regelous for Massive
Engineering Emmy Award: Steve Vitolo, Felipe A. Mendez, and Franco Zuccar for Scriptation
Engineering Emmy Award: Nicolaas Verheem, Marius van der Watt, Dennis Scheftner, and Zvi Reznic for Teradek Bolt 4K
Engineering Emmy Award: Chaos for V-Ray
Charles F. Jenkins Lifetime Achievement Award: Reed Hastings
Philo T. Farnsworth Corporate Achievement Engineering Award: Dolby Laboratories

The 73rd Primetime Emmy Engineering Awards Ceremony took place on Thursday, Oct. 21, at the JW Marriott Hotel, Los Angeles LA LIVE.

2022 
Engineering Emmy Award: Mark Hills and Marc Bakos for the Cleanfeed Remote Audio Review/Recording System
Engineering Emmy Award: Disguise Technologies Ltd. for the Disguise Platform
Engineering Emmy Award: Industrial Light & Magic for the StageCraft Virtual Production Tool Suite
Engineering Emmy Award: Geoffrey Crawshaw and William Brinkley for the Leostream Remote Access Software
Engineering Emmy Award: Shure Incorporated for the Axient Digital Wireless Audio System
Engineering Emmy Award: Sohonet for the ClearView Pivot Remote Collaboration Tool
Engineering Emmy Award: Stype Cajic, Andrija Cajic, Daniel Kruselj and Ivica Antolkovic for the stYpe Suite of Optical/Camera Tracking Tools
Charles F. Jenkins Lifetime Achievement Award: Paul Debevec
Philo T. Farnsworth Corporate Achievement Engineering Award: ARRI

The 74th Primetime Emmy Engineering Awards Ceremony took place on Wednesday, Sept. 28, 2022.

See also
 List of American television awards
 List of engineering awards

References

Engineering awards
Engineering